The Theodor Heuss Bridge also known as the Nordbrücke (North bridge) is a cable-stayed bridge over the Rhine River in Düsseldorf built from 1953 to 1957 with a main span of  flanked on either side by spans of .

It was the first cable-stayed bridge built in Germany. Along with two other cable-stayed bridges to the south, the Oberkassel Bridge and the Knie Bridge, the Theodor Heuss Bridge forms the central leg of Düsseldorf's family of bridges over the Rhine.

The bridge carries Bundesstraße 7, downtown connector to Autobahn 52. Growing traffic volume in the bridge relaxed in May 2002 due to the opening of the Airport Bridge to the north.

See also 
 List of bridges in Germany

External links
 
National Information Service for Earthquake Engineering - Cable-Stayed With Steel Deck

Cable-stayed bridges in Germany
Road bridges in Germany
Bridges completed in 1957
Bridges over the Rhine
Buildings and structures in Düsseldorf
Bridges in North Rhine-Westphalia
Theodor Heuss